Ebelyakh is a rural locality (a selo), the only inhabited locality, and the administrative center of Ebelyakhsky Rural Okrug of Anabarsky District in the Sakha Republic, Russia, located  from Saskylakh, the administrative center of the district. Its population as of the 2010 Census was 36; down from 988 recorded in the 2002 Census.

References

Notes

Sources
Official website of the Sakha Republic. Registry of the Administrative-Territorial Divisions of the Sakha Republic. Anabarsky District. 

Rural localities in the Sakha Republic